Toporów may refer to:
Toporów, Łódź Voivodeship (central Poland)
Toporów, Lubusz Voivodeship (west Poland)
Toporów, Subcarpathian Voivodeship (south-east Poland)
Toporów, Świętokrzyskie Voivodeship (south-central Poland)
Toporów, Masovian Voivodeship (east-central Poland)
Toporów, Greater Poland Voivodeship (west-central Poland)